Energy and Mineral Resources Division is a Bangladesh government division under the Ministry of Power, Energy and Mineral Resources responsible for managing hydrocarbon mining and processing in Bangladesh. Dr Khairuzzaman Mozumder is the Secretary in charge of the division.

History
Energy and Mineral Resources Division was established in 1998 under the Ministry of Power, Energy and Mineral Resources.

References

1998 establishments in Bangladesh
Organisations based in Dhaka
Government departments of Bangladesh
Government divisions of Bangladesh